Elena Pavlovna Belova; born 25 July 1965) is a former Russian biathlete who competed in the 1992 Winter Olympics.

References

External links
 

1965 births
Living people
People from Magnitogorsk
Russian female biathletes
Olympic biathletes of the Unified Team
Biathletes at the 1992 Winter Olympics
Olympic bronze medalists for the Unified Team
Olympic medalists in biathlon
Biathlon World Championships medalists
Medalists at the 1992 Winter Olympics
Soviet female biathletes
Sportspeople from Chelyabinsk Oblast